The Worship of the Serpent is an 1833 study, written by the clergyman John Bathurst Deane, of snake worship and specifically the snake mentioned in the Book of Genesis who convinced Eve to eat the fruit of the Tree of the Knowledge of Good and Evil, leading her to convince Adam to do the same.

Overview
A number of Gnostic texts, some only discovered recently such as those from the Nag Hammadi library, expound on an idea of knowledge and how the serpent gave knowledge to man. Deane draws a number of conclusions and makes certain guesses regarding snake worship, not just confined to Europe, but indeed all over the world. Deane goes on in his title to list a number of associations to the serpent such as the dragon and the leviathan. So thorough (albeit outdated) is his research, that he has "traced THE WORSHIP OF THE SERPENT from Babylonia, east and west, through Persia, Hindûstan, China, Mexico, Britain, Scandinavia, Italy, Illyricum, Thrace, Greece, Asia Minor, and Phœnicia." (Ch VIII)

See also 
 Ophites
 Serpents in the Bible
 Snake worship

Notes

External links 
The Worship of the Serpent (full text online)
The sons of the Serpent Tribe
The Ophites, The Gnostics and Their Remains by Charles William King 1887

1833 non-fiction books
Books by John Bathurst Deane
English-language books
English non-fiction books
Mythology books
Religious studies books